Lewis Allan Reed (March 2, 1942October 27, 2013) was an American musician, songwriter, and poet.  He was the guitarist, singer, and principal songwriter for the rock band the Velvet Underground and had a solo career that spanned five decades. Although not commercially successful during its existence, the Velvet Underground became regarded as one of the most influential bands in the history of underground and alternative rock music. Reed's distinctive deadpan voice, poetic and transgressive lyrics, and experimental guitar playing were trademarks throughout his long career.

Having played guitar and sung in doo-wop groups in high school, Reed studied poetry at Syracuse University under Delmore Schwartz, and had served as a radio DJ, hosting a late-night avant garde music program while at college.  After graduating from Syracuse, he went to work for Pickwick Records in New York City, a low-budget record company that specialized in sound-alike recordings, as a songwriter and session musician.  A fellow session player at Pickwick was John Cale; together with Sterling Morrison and Angus MacLise, they would form the Velvet Underground in 1965.  After building a reputation on the avant garde music scene, they gained the attention of Andy Warhol, who became the band's manager; they in turn became something of a fixture at The Factory, Warhol's art studio, and served as his "house band" for various projects.  The band released their first album, now with drummer Moe Tucker and featuring German singer Nico, in 1967, and parted ways with Warhol shortly thereafter.  Following several lineup changes and three more little-heard albums, Reed quit the band in 1970.

After leaving the band, Reed would go on to a much more commercially successful solo career, releasing twenty solo studio albums. His second, Transformer (1972), was produced by David Bowie and arranged by Mick Ronson, and brought him mainstream recognition. The album is considered an influential landmark of the glam rock genre, anchored by Reed's most successful single, "Walk on the Wild Side". After Transformer, the less commercial but critically acclaimed Berlin peaked at No. 7 on the UK Albums Chart. Rock 'n' Roll Animal (a live album released in 1974) sold strongly, and Sally Can't Dance (1974) peaked at No. 10 on the Billboard 200; but for a long period after, Reed's work did not translate into sales, leading him deeper into drug addiction and alcoholism. Reed cleaned up in the early 1980s, and gradually returned to prominence with The Blue Mask (1982) and New Sensations (1984), reaching a critical and commercial career peak with his 1989 album New York.

Reed participated in the re-formation of the Velvet Underground in the 1990s, and he made several more albums, including a collaboration album with John Cale titled Songs for Drella, which was a tribute to their former mentor Andy Warhol. Magic and Loss (1992) would become Reed's highest-charting album on the UK Albums Chart, peaking at No. 6.

He contributed music to two theatrical interpretations of 19th-century writers, one of which he developed into an album titled The Raven. He married his third wife Laurie Anderson in 2008, and recorded the collaboration album Lulu with Metallica. He died in 2013 of liver disease. Reed has been inducted into the Rock and Roll Hall of Fame twice: as a member of the Velvet Underground in 1996 and as a solo act in 2015.

Biography

1942–1957: Early life
Lewis Allan Reed was born on March 2, 1942, at Beth-El Hospital (later Brookdale) in Brooklyn and grew up in Freeport, Long Island. Reed was the son of Toby (née Futterman) (1920–2013) and Sidney Joseph Reed (1913–2005), an accountant. His family was Jewish and his grandparents were Russian Jews who had fled antisemitism; his father had changed his name from Rabinowitz to Reed. Reed said that although he was Jewish, his "real god was rock 'n' roll".

Reed attended Atkinson Elementary School in Freeport and went on to Freeport Junior High School. His sister Merrill, born Margaret Reed, said that as an adolescent, he suffered panic attacks, became socially awkward and "possessed a fragile temperament" but was highly focused on things that he liked, mainly music. Having learned to play the guitar from the radio, he developed an early interest in rock and roll and rhythm and blues, and during high school played in several bands.

He began experimenting with drugs at the age of 16.

Reed was dyslexic.

1958–1964: Early recordings and education 
Reed's first recording was as a member of a doo-wop three-piece group called the Jades, with Reed providing guitar accompaniment and singing backing vocals. After participating at a talent show at Freeport Junior High School in early 1958, and receiving an enthusiastic response from the audience, the group was given the chance to record an original single "So Blue" with the B-side "Leave Her for Me" later that year. While the single didn't chart, notable saxophonist King Curtis was brought in as a session musician by the producer Bob Shad to play on both songs, and the single was played by a substitute DJ during the Murray the K radio show, which gave Reed his first-ever airplay. Reed's love for playing music and his desire to play gigs brought him into confrontation with his anxious and unaccommodating parents.

His sister recalled that during his first year in college he was brought home one day, having had a mental breakdown, after which he remained "depressed, anxious, and socially unresponsive" for a time, and that his parents were having difficulty coping. Visiting a psychologist, Reed's parents were made to feel guilty as inadequate parents, and they consented to giving him electroconvulsive therapy (ECT). Reed appeared to blame his father for the treatment to which he had been subjected. He wrote about the experience in his song "Kill Your Sons" from the album Sally Can't Dance (1974). Reed later recalled the experience as having been traumatic and leading to memory loss. He believed that he was treated to dispel his homosexual feelings. After Reed's death, his sister denied the ECT treatments were intended to suppress his "homosexual urges", asserting that their parents were not homophobic but had been told by his doctors that ECT was necessary to treat Reed's mental and behavioral issues.

Upon his recovery from his illness and associated treatment, Reed resumed his education at Syracuse University in 1960, studying journalism, film directing, and creative writing. He was a platoon leader in ROTC; he said he was later expelled from the program for holding an unloaded gun to his superior's head.

Reed played music on campus under numerous band names (one being 'L.A. and the Eldorados') and played throughout Central New York. Per his bandmates, they were routinely kicked out of fraternity parties for their brash personalities and insistence on performing their own material. In 1961, he began hosting a late-night radio program on WAER called Excursions on a Wobbly Rail. Named after a song by pianist Cecil Taylor, the program typically featured doo wop, rhythm and blues, and jazz, particularly the free jazz developed in the mid-1950s. Reed said that when he started out he was inspired by such musicians as Ornette Coleman, who had "always been a great influence" on him; he said that his guitar on "European Son" was his way of trying to imitate the jazz saxophonist. Reed's sister said that during her brother's time at Syracuse, the university authorities had tried unsuccessfully to expel him because they did not approve of his extracurricular activities. At Syracuse University, he studied under poet Delmore Schwartz, who he said was "the first great person I ever met", and they became friends. He credited Schwartz with showing him how "with the simplest language imaginable, and very short, you can accomplish the most astonishing heights." One of Reed's fellow students at Syracuse in the early 1960s (who also studied under Schwartz) was the musician Garland Jeffreys; they remained close friends until the end of Reed's life.

Jeffreys recalled Reed's time at Syracuse: "At four in the afternoon we'd all meet at [the bar] The Orange Grove. Me, Delmore and Lou. That would often be the center of the crew. And Delmore was the leader – our quiet leader." While at Syracuse, Reed was also introduced to intravenous drug use for the first time, and quickly contracted hepatitis. Reed later dedicated the song "European Son", from the first Velvet Underground album, to Schwartz. In 1982, Reed recorded "My House" from his album The Blue Mask as a tribute to his late mentor. He later said that his goals as a writer were "to bring the sensitivities of the novel to rock music" or to write the Great American Novel in a record album. Reed met  Sterling Morrison, a student at City University of New York, while the latter was visiting mutual friend, and fellow Syracuse student, Jim Tucker. Reed graduated from Syracuse University's College of Arts and Sciences with a B.A. cum laude in English in June 1964.

1964–1970: Pickwick and the Velvet Underground

Reed moved to New York City in 1964 to work as an in-house songwriter for Pickwick Records. He can be heard singing lead on two cuts on The Surfsiders Sing The Beach Boys Songbook. For Pickwick, Reed also wrote and recorded the single "The Ostrich", a parody of popular dance songs of the time, which included lines such as "put your head on the floor and have somebody step on it". His employers felt that the song had hit potential, and assembled a supporting band to help promote the recording. The ad hoc band, called the Primitives: Reed, Welsh musician John Cale, who had recently moved to New York to study music and was playing viola in composer La Monte Young's Theatre of Eternal Music, Tony Conrad and sculptor Walter De Maria. Cale and Conrad were surprised to find that for "The Ostrich", Reed tuned each string of his guitar to the same note, which they began to call his "ostrich guitar" tuning. This technique created a drone effect similar to their experimentation in Young's avant-garde ensemble. Disappointed with Reed's performance, Cale was nevertheless impressed by Reed's early repertoire (including "Heroin"), and a partnership began to evolve.

Reed and Cale (who played viola, keyboards and bass guitar) lived together on the Lower East Side, and invited Reed's college acquaintance guitarist Sterling Morrison and Cale's neighbor drummer Angus MacLise to join the band, thus forming the Velvet Underground. When the opportunity came to play their first paying gig at Summit High School in Summit, New Jersey, MacLise quit because he believed that accepting money for art was a sellout and did not want to participate in a structured gig. He was replaced on drums by Moe Tucker, the sister of Reed and Morrison's mutual friend Jim Tucker. Initially a fill in for that one show she soon became a full-time member with her drumming an integral part of the band's sound, despite Cale's initial objections. Though it had little commercial success, the band is considered one of the most influential in rock history. Reed was the main singer and songwriter in the band.

The band soon came to the attention of Andy Warhol. One of Warhol's first contributions was to integrate them into the Exploding Plastic Inevitable. Warhol's associates inspired many of Reed's songs as he fell into a thriving, multifaceted artistic scene. Reed rarely gave an interview without paying homage to Warhol as a mentor. Warhol pushed the band to take on a chanteuse, the German former model and singer Nico. Despite his initial resistance, Reed wrote several songs for Nico to sing, and the two were briefly lovers.

The Velvet Underground & Nico was released in March 1967 and peaked at No. 171 on the U.S. Billboard 200. Much later, Rolling Stone listed it as the 13th greatest album of all time; Brian Eno once stated that although few people bought the album, most of them were inspired to form their own bands. Václav Havel credited the album, which he bought while visiting the U.S., with inspiring him to become president of Czechoslovakia.

By the time the band recorded White Light/White Heat, Nico had quit the band and Warhol had been fired, both against Cale's wishes. Warhol's replacement as manager was Steve Sesnick. In September 1968, Cale left the band at Reed's behest. Morrison and Tucker were discomfited by Reed's tactics but continued with the band. Cale's replacement was Boston-based musician Doug Yule, who played bass guitar, keyboards and who would soon share lead vocal duties in the band with Reed. The band now took on a more pop-oriented sound and acted more as a vehicle for Reed to develop his songwriting craft. They released two studio albums with this lineup: 1969's The Velvet Underground and 1970's Loaded. Reed left the Velvet Underground in August 1970. The band disintegrated after Morrison and Tucker departed in 1971.

1970–1975: Glam rock and commercial breakthrough
After leaving the Velvet Underground, Reed moved to his parents' home on Long Island, and took a job at his father's tax accounting firm as a typist, by his own account earning $40 a week ($ in  dollars). He signed a recording contract with RCA Records in 1971 and recorded his first solo album at Morgan Studios in Willesden, London with session musicians including Steve Howe and Rick Wakeman from the band Yes. The album, Lou Reed, contained versions of unreleased Velvet Underground songs, some of which had originally been recorded for Loaded but shelved. This album was overlooked by most pop music critics and did not sell well, although music critic Stephen Holden, in Rolling Stone, called it an "almost perfect album. ... which embodied the spirit of the Velvets." Holden went on to compare Reed's voice with those of Mick Jagger and Bob Dylan and to praise the poetic quality of his lyrics.

Reed's commercial breakthrough album, Transformer, was released in November 1972. Transformer was co-produced by David Bowie and Mick Ronson, and it introduced Reed to a wider audience, especially in the UK. The single "Walk on the Wild Side" was a salute to the misfits and hustlers who once surrounded Andy Warhol in the late '60s and appeared in his films. Each of the song's five verses describes a person who had been a fixture at The Factory during the mid-to-late 1960s: (1) Holly Woodlawn, (2) Candy Darling, (3) "Little Joe" Dallesandro, (4) "Sugar Plum Fairy" Joe Campbell and (5) Jackie Curtis. The song's transgressive lyrics evaded radio censorship. Though the jazzy arrangement (courtesy of bassist Herbie Flowers and saxophonist Ronnie Ross) was musically atypical for Reed, it eventually became his signature song. It came about as a result of a commission to compose a soundtrack to a theatrical adaptation of Nelson Algren's novel of the same name; the play failed to materialize. "Walk on the Wild Side" was Reed's only entry in the Billboard Hot 100 singles chart, at No. 16.

Ronson's arrangements brought out new aspects of Reed's songs. "Perfect Day", for example, features delicate strings and soaring dynamics. It was rediscovered in the 1990s and allowed Reed to drop "Walk on the Wild Side" from his concerts.

Bowie and Reed fell out during a late-night meeting which led to Reed hitting Bowie. Bowie had told Reed that he would have to "clean up his act" if they were to work together again. Reed hired a local New York bar-band, the Tots, to tour in support of Transformer and spent much of 1972 and early 1973 on the road with them. Though they improved over the months, Reed (with producer Bob Ezrin's encouragement) decided to recruit a new backing band in anticipation of the upcoming Berlin album. He chose keyboardist Moogy Klingman to come up with a new five-member band on barely a week's notice.

Reed married Bettye Kronstad in 1973. She later said he had been a violent drunk when on tour. Berlin (July 1973) was a concept album about two speed-freaks in love in the city. The songs variously concern domestic violence ("Caroline Says I", "Caroline Says II"), drug addiction ("How Do You Think It Feels"), adultery and prostitution ("The Kids"), and suicide ("The Bed"). Reed's late 1973 European tour, featuring lead guitarists Steve Hunter and Dick Wagner, mixed his Berlin material with older numbers. Response to Berlin at the time of its release was negative, with Rolling Stone pronouncing it "a disaster". Reed found the poor reviews it received very frustrating. Since then the album has been critically reevaluated, and in 2003 Rolling Stone included it in their list of the 500 greatest albums of all time. Berlin peaked at No. 7 on the UK Albums Chart.

Following the commercial disappointment of Berlin, Reed befriended Steve Katz of Blood, Sweat & Tears (who was the brother of his then-manager Dennis Katz), who suggested Reed put together a "great live band" and release a live album of Velvet Underground songs. Katz would come on board as producer, and the album Rock 'n' Roll Animal (February 1974) contained live performances of the Velvet Underground songs "Sweet Jane", "Heroin", "White Light/White Heat", and "Rock and Roll". Wagner's live arrangements, and Hunter's intro to "Sweet Jane" which opened the album, gave Reed's songs the live rock sound he was looking for, and the album peaked at No. 45 on the Billboard 200 for 28 weeks and soon became Reed's biggest selling album. It went gold in 1978, with 500,000 certified sales.

Sally Can't Dance which was released later that year (in August 1974), became Reed's highest-charting album in the United States, peaking at No. 10 during a 14-week stay on the Billboard 200 album chart in October 1974.

In October 2019, an audio tape of publicly unknown music by Reed, based on Warhol's 1975 book, "The Philosophy of Andy Warhol: From A to B and Back Again", was reported to have been discovered in an archive at The Andy Warhol Museum in Pittsburgh, Pennsylvania.

1975–1979: Addiction and creative work

Throughout the 1970s, Reed was a heavy user of methamphetamine and alcohol. In the summer of 1975, he was booked to headline Startruckin' 75 in Europe, a touring rock festival organized by Miles Copeland. However, Reed's drug addiction made him unreliable and he never performed on the tour, causing Copeland to replace him with Ike & Tina Turner.

Reed's album Metal Machine Music (1975) was an hour of modulated feedback and guitar effects. Described by Rolling Stone as the "tubular groaning of a galactic refrigerator", many critics interpreted it as a gesture of contempt, an attempt to break his contract with RCA or to alienate his less sophisticated fans. Reed claimed that the album was a genuine artistic effort inspired by the drone music of La Monte Young, and suggesting that quotations of classical music could be found buried in the feedback, but he also said, "Well, anyone who gets to side four is dumber than I am." Lester Bangs declared it "genius", though also psychologically disturbing. The album, now regarded as a visionary textural guitar masterpiece by some music critics, was reportedly returned to stores by the thousands and was withdrawn after a few weeks.

1975's Coney Island Baby was dedicated to Reed's then-partner Rachel Humphreys, a transgender woman Reed dated and lived with for three years. Humphreys also appears in the photos on the cover of Reed's 1977 "best of" album, Walk on the Wild Side: The Best of Lou Reed. Rock and Roll Heart was his 1976 debut for his new record label Arista, and Street Hassle (1978) was released in the midst of the punk rock scene he had helped to inspire. Reed took on a watchful, competitive and sometimes dismissive attitude towards punk. Aware that he had inspired them, he regularly attended shows at CBGB to track the artistic and commercial development of numerous punk bands, and a cover illustration and interview of Reed appeared in the first issue of Punk magazine by Legs McNeil.
 
Reed released his third live album, Live: Take No Prisoners, in 1978; some critics thought it was his "bravest work yet", while others considered it his "silliest". Rolling Stone described it as "one of the funniest live albums ever recorded" and compared Reed's monologs with those of Lenny Bruce. Reed felt it was his best album to date. The Bells (1979) featured jazz trumpeter Don Cherry. During 1979 Reed toured extensively in Europe and throughout the United States performing a wide range of songs, including a suite of core songs from his Berlin album and the title track from The Bells featuring Chuck Hammer on guitar-synth. Around this time Reed also appeared as a record producer in Paul Simon's film One-Trick Pony. From around 1979 Reed began to wean himself off drugs.

1980–1989: Marriage and mid-period

Reed married British designer Sylvia Morales in 1980. Morales inspired Reed to write several songs, particularly "Think It Over" from 1980's Growing Up in Public and "Heavenly Arms" from 1982's The Blue Mask. The latter album was enthusiastically received by critics such as Rolling Stone writer Tom Carson, whose review began, "Lou Reed’s The Blue Mask is a great record, and its genius is at once so simple and unusual that the only appropriate reaction is wonder. Who expected anything like this from Reed at this late stage of the game?" In the Village Voice, Robert Christgau called The Blue Mask "his most controlled, plainspoken, deeply felt, and uninhibited album." After Legendary Hearts (1983) and New Sensations (1984), Reed was sufficiently reestablished as a public figure to become a spokesman for Honda scooters. In the early 1980s, Reed worked with guitarists including Chuck Hammer on Growing Up in Public, and Robert Quine on The Blue Mask and Legendary Hearts.

Reed's 1984 album New Sensations marked the first time that Reed had charted within the US Top 100 since 1978's Street Hassle, and the first time that Reed had charted in the UK altogether since 1976's Coney Island Baby. Although its lead single "I Love You, Suzanne" only charted at No. 78 on the UK Singles Chart it did receive light rotation on MTV. Two more singles were released from the album: "My Red Joystick" and the Dutch-only release "High in the City" but they both failed to chart.

In 1998, The New York Times observed that in the 1970s, Reed had a distinctive persona: "Back then he was publicly gay, pretended to shoot heroin onstage, and cultivated a 'Dachau panda' look, with cropped peroxide hair and black circles painted under his eyes." The newspaper wrote that in 1980, "Reed renounced druggy theatrics, even swore off intoxicants themselves, and became openly heterosexual, openly married."

On September 22, 1985, Reed performed at the first Farm Aid concert in Champaign, Illinois. He performed "Doin' the Things That We Want To", "I Love You, Suzanne", "New Sensations" and "Walk on the Wild Side" as his solo set. In June 1986, Reed released Mistrial (co-produced with bassist Fernando Saunders). To support the album, he released two music videos: "No Money Down" and "The Original Wrapper". In the same year, he joined Amnesty International's A Conspiracy of Hope short tour and was outspoken about New York City's political issues and personalities. He also appeared on Steven Van Zandt's 1985 anti-Apartheid song "Sun City", pledging not to play at that resort.

The 1989 album New York, which commented on crime, AIDS, civil rights activist Jesse Jackson, then-President of Austria Kurt Waldheim, and Pope John Paul II, became his second gold-certified work when it passed 500,000 sales in 1997. Reed was nominated for a Grammy Award for best male rock vocal performance for the album.

1990–1999: Velvet Underground reunion and various projects
Reed met John Cale for the first time in several years at Warhol's funeral in 1987. They worked together on the album Songs for Drella (April 1990), a song cycle about Warhol. On the album, Reed sings of his love for his late friend, and criticizes both the doctors who were unable to save Warhol's life and Warhol's would-be assassin, Valerie Solanas. In 1990, the first Velvet Underground lineup reformed for a Fondation Cartier benefit show in France. In June and July 1993, the Velvet Underground again reunited and toured Europe, including an appearance at the Glastonbury Festival; plans for a North American tour were canceled following a dispute between Reed and Cale.

Reed had released his sixteenth solo album, Magic and Loss, in January 1992. The album is focused on mortality, inspired by the death of two close friends from cancer. In 1994, he appeared in A Celebration: The Music of Pete Townshend and The Who. In the same year, he and Morales were divorced. In 1995, Reed made a cameo appearance in the unreleased video game Penn & Teller's Smoke and Mirrors. If the player selects the "impossible" difficulty setting, Reed appears shortly after the game begins as an unbeatable boss who murders the player with his laser beam eyes. Reed then pops up on the screen and says to the player, "This is the impossible level, boys. Impossible doesn't mean very difficult, very difficult is winning the Nobel Prize, impossible is eating the sun."

The Velvet Underground were inducted into the Rock and Roll Hall of Fame in 1996. At the ceremony, Reed, Cale and Tucker performed a song titled "Last Night I Said Goodbye to My Friend", dedicated to Sterling Morrison, who had died the previous August. In February 1996 Reed released Set the Twilight Reeling, and later that year, Reed contributed songs and music to Time Rocker, a theatrical interpretation of H. G. Wells' The Time Machine by experimental director Robert Wilson. The piece premiered in the Thalia Theater, Hamburg, and was later also shown at the Brooklyn Academy of Music in New York.

From 1992, Reed was romantically linked to avant-garde artist Laurie Anderson, and the two worked together on several recordings. They married on April 12, 2008.

2000–2012: Rock and ambient experimentation
In February 2000, Reed worked with Robert Wilson at the Thalia Theater again, on POEtry, another production inspired by the works of a 19th-century writer, this time Edgar Allan Poe. In April 2000, Reed released Ecstasy. In January 2003, Reed released a 2-CD set, The Raven, based on POEtry. The album consists of songs written by Reed and spoken-word performances of reworked and rewritten texts of Edgar Allan Poe by actors, set to electronic music composed by Reed. It features Willem Dafoe, David Bowie, Steve Buscemi, and Ornette Coleman. A single disc CD version of the album, focusing on the music, was also released.

In May 2000, Reed performed before Pope John Paul II at the Great Jubilee Concert in Rome. In 2001, Reed made a cameo appearance in the movie adaptation of Prozac Nation. On October 6, 2001, the New York Times published a Reed poem called "Laurie Sadly Listening" in which he reflects on the September 11 attacks (also referred to as 9/11). Incorrect reports of Reed's death were broadcast by numerous US radio stations in 2001, caused by a hoax email (purporting to be from Reuters) which said he had died of a drug overdose. In April 2003, Reed began a world tour featuring the cellist Jane Scarpantoni and singer Anohni.

In 2003, Reed released a book of photographs, Emotions in Action. This comprised an A4-sized book called Emotions and a smaller one called Actions laid into its hard cover. In January 2006, he released a second book of photographs, Lou Reed's New York. A third volume, Romanticism, was released in 2009.

In 2004, a Groovefinder remix of his song "Satellite of Love", called "Satellite of Love '04", was released. It peaked at No. 10 on the UK Singles Chart.

In October 2006, Reed appeared at Hal Willner's Leonard Cohen tribute show "Came So Far for Beauty" in Dublin, along with Laurie Anderson, Nick Cave, Anohni, Jarvis Cocker, and Beth Orton. He played a heavy metal version of Cohen's "The Stranger Song".

In December that year, Reed played a series of shows at St. Ann's Warehouse, Brooklyn, based on Berlin. Reed played with guitarist Steve Hunter, who played on the original album and Rock 'n' Roll Animal, and was joined by singers Anohni and Sharon Jones. The show was produced by Bob Ezrin, who also produced the original album, and Hal Willner. The show played at the Sydney Festival in January 2007 and in Europe during June and July 2007. The album version of the concert, entitled Berlin: Live at St. Ann's Warehouse, and a live film recording of these concerts were both released in 2008. In April 2007, he released Hudson River Wind Meditations, an album of ambient meditational music. It was released on the Sounds True record label. In June 2007, he performed at the Traffic Festival 2007 in Turin, Italy, a five-day free event organized by the city. In the same month "Pale Blue Eyes" was included in the soundtrack of the French-language film, The Diving Bell and the Butterfly. In August 2007, Reed recorded "Tranquilize" with the Killers in New York City, a duet with Brandon Flowers for the B-side/rarities album Sawdust.

On October 2 and 3, 2008, he introduced his new group, which was later named Metal Machine Trio, at the Walt Disney Concert Hall Complex in Los Angeles. The trio featured Ulrich Krieger (saxophone) and Sarth Calhoun (electronics), and played improvized instrumental music inspired by Metal Machine Music. Recordings of the concerts were released under the title The Creation of the Universe. The trio played at New York's Gramercy Theatre in April 2009, and appeared as part of Reed's band at the 2009 Lollapalooza.

Reed provided the voice of Maltazard, the villain in the 2009 Luc Besson animated/live-action feature film Arthur and the Revenge of Maltazard and appeared as himself in Wim Wenders' 2008 film Palermo Shooting.

Reed played "Sweet Jane" and "White Light/White Heat" with Metallica at Madison Square Garden during the twenty-fifth anniversary celebration of the Rock and Roll Hall of Fame on October 30, 2009. In 2010, Reed featured on the song "Some Kind of Nature" with virtual band Gorillaz, from their third studio album Plastic Beach. In October 2011, Metallica and Reed released the collaboration album Lulu. It was based on the "Lulu" plays by the German playwright Frank Wedekind (1864–1918). The album received mixed and mainly negative reviews from music critics. Reed joked that he had no fans left. The album debuted at No. 36 on the Billboard 200 with first-week sales of 13,000 copies, and went on to sell 280,000 copies worldwide.

In 2012, Reed collaborated with indie rock band Metric on "The Wanderlust", the tenth track on their fifth studio album  Synthetica. This was to be the last original composition he worked on.

Posthumous release
In June 2022, Lou Reed Archive Series was announced by Light in the Attic Records with Laurie Anderson. The collection will release unreleased material with an album called Words & Music, May 1965.

Death, legacy, and honors
Reed had suffered from hepatitis and diabetes for several years. He practiced  tai chi during the last part of his life. He was treated with interferon but developed liver cancer. In May 2013, he underwent a liver transplant at the Cleveland Clinic. Afterward, on his website, he wrote of feeling "bigger and stronger" than ever, but on October 27, 2013, he died from liver disease at his home in East Hampton, New York, at the age of 71. He was cremated and the ashes were given to his family.

His widow, Laurie Anderson, said his last days were peaceful, and described him as a "prince and a fighter". David Byrne, Patti Smith, David Bowie, Morrissey, Iggy Pop, Courtney Love, Lenny Kravitz, and many others also paid tribute to Reed. Former Velvet Underground members Moe Tucker and John Cale made statements on Reed's death, and those from outside the music industry paid their respects such as Cardinal Gianfranco Ravasi.

On October 27, 2013, the day of Reed's death, Pearl Jam dedicated their song "Man of the Hour" to him at their show in Baltimore and then played "I'm Waiting for the Man". On the day of his death, the Killers dedicated their rendition of "Pale Blue Eyes" to Reed at the Life Is Beautiful festival in Las Vegas. My Morning Jacket performed a cover of "Oh! Sweet Nuthin'" in California, while Arctic Monkeys performed "Walk on the Wild Side" in Liverpool. That same night, Phish opened their show in Hartford, Connecticut, with the Velvet Underground's "Rock & Roll". On November 14, 2013, a three-hour public memorial was held near Lincoln Center's Paul Milstein Pool and Terrace. Billed as "New York: Lou Reed at Lincoln Center", the ceremony featured favorite Reed recordings selected by family and friends. On March 14, 2014, Richard Barone and Alejandro Escovedo produced and hosted the first full-scale tribute to Lou Reed at the SXSW Music Festival in Austin, Texas, with over twenty international acts performing Reed's music.

Reed's estate was valued at $30 million, $20 million of which accrued after his death. He left everything to his wife and his sister.

Reed's induction into the Rock and Roll Hall of Fame as a solo artist was announced on December 16, 2014. He was inducted by Patti Smith at a ceremony in Cleveland on April 18, 2015. In 2017, Lou Reed: A Life was published by the Rolling Stone critic Anthony DeCurtis.

Asteroid 270553 Loureed, discovered by Maik Meyer at Palomar Observatory in 2002, was named in his honor. The official  was published by the Minor Planet Center on June 2, 2015. Spiders with furry bodies are known as velvet spiders and one which was recently discovered in Spain is named Loureedia, because it has a velvet body and lives underground.

An archive of his letters and other personal effects was donated to the New York Public Library for the Performing Arts, where it can be viewed by members of the public. In June 2022, the Library for the Performing Arts at Lincoln Center hosted the "Lou Reed: Caught Between the Twisted Stars", the first exhibition drawn from Reed's archive.

In 2015, in the unofficial biography Notes From The Velvet Underground, biographer Howard Sounes described Reed as having been misogynistic and violent toward women he was in relationships with and racist, having called Donna Summer and Bob Dylan racial and ethnic slurs.

Equipment

Guitars
Lou Reed's main guitar during the Velvet Underground era was a 1964 Gretsch Country Gentleman, which he modified extensively, to the extent that it became unplayable. He played various stock Fender Telecasters, later favoring models that were built specifically for him, such as the Rick Kelly 'Lou Reed's T' Custom Telecaster and the Fender Custom Shop Danny Gatton Telecaster. He has played various other electric guitars throughout his career:
 Carl Thompson
 Steve Klein
 Epiphone Riviera
 Steinberger Synapse Transcale ST-2FPA Custom
Gibson ES-335TD
Fender Electric XII twelve-string
 Gibson SG

Amplifiers
 Jim Kelley Amplifiers
 Fender 'wide panel tweed' Deluxe Amp 5C3
 Soldano SLO 100 100-Watt Tube guitar amplifier
 Tone King Imperial 1×12 Combo guitar amplifier
 Sears Silvertone 1484 Twin-Twelve

Discography

The Velvet Underground
 The Velvet Underground & Nico (1967)
 White Light/White Heat (1968)
 The Velvet Underground (1969)
 Loaded (1970)

Solo
 Lou Reed (1972)
 Transformer (1972)
 Berlin (1973)
 Sally Can't Dance (1974)
 Metal Machine Music (1975)
 Coney Island Baby (1975)
 Rock and Roll Heart (1976)
 Street Hassle (1978)
 The Bells (1979)
 Growing Up in Public (1980)
 The Blue Mask (1982)
 Legendary Hearts (1983)
 New Sensations (1984)
 Mistrial (1986)
 New York (1989)
 Magic and Loss (1992)
 Set the Twilight Reeling (1996)
 Ecstasy (2000)
 The Raven (2003)
 Hudson River Wind Meditations (2007)

Collaborations
 Songs for Drella (1990) (with John Cale)
 Lulu (2011) (with Metallica)

Filmography

References
Notes

Citations
 

Bibliography

External links

 
 
 
 
Lou Reed papers, 1958-2015, held by the Music Division, New York Public Library for the Performing Arts

 
1942 births
2013 deaths
20th-century American male singers
21st-century American male singers
20th-century American guitarists
21st-century American guitarists
American baritones
American street performers
American experimental guitarists
American male guitarists
American male singer-songwriters
American people of Russian-Jewish descent
American poets
American rock guitarists
American rock singers
American rock songwriters
Art rock musicians
Bisexual Jews
Bisexual men
Bisexual singers
Bisexual songwriters
Bisexual photographers
Deaths from liver disease
Glam rock musicians
Guitarists from New York City
Ivor Novello Award winners
Jewish American songwriters
Jewish American musicians
Jewish rock musicians
Jewish punk rock musicians
Jewish singers
Rhythm guitarists
Lead guitarists
LGBT people from New York (state)
American LGBT singers
American LGBT songwriters
American LGBT photographers
Liver transplant recipients
Matador Records artists
MGM Records artists
Musicians from Brooklyn
American noise musicians
People from Freeport, New York
People from Hardwick Township, New Jersey
Photographers from New York (state)
Protopunk musicians
RCA Records artists
Reprise Records artists
Singers from New York City
Sire Records artists
Syracuse University alumni
The Velvet Underground members
Warner Records artists
People from East Hampton (town), New York
People associated with The Factory
Singer-songwriters from New York (state)
People with dyslexia